The Ukrainian Week is an illustrated weekly magazine covering politics, economics and the arts and aimed at the socially engaged Ukrainian-language reader. It provides a range of analysis, opinion, interviews, feature pieces, including travel both in Ukraine and outside, and art reviews and events calendar. Its first editor-in-chief was Yuriy Makarov.

History and profile
The Ukrainian Week is published in Ukraine by ECEM Media Ukraine GmbH (Austria), and was established in November 2007. The magazine is one of several Ukrainian language magazines that have appeared in Ukraine in the wake of the Orange Revolution.

The English edition of The Ukrainian Week is published bi-monthly and contains a selection of articles deemed to be of most interest to non-Ukrainian readers.

In 2012, it published its statement accusing the state powers and major media-holdings de facto monopolizing the market, of harassment.

See also
List of magazines in Ukraine

References

External links
Official website (Тиждень.ua, tyzhden.ua)
Official website (International edition, ukrainianweek.com)

2007 establishments in Ukraine
Magazines established in 2007
English-language magazines
Ukrainian-language magazines
News magazines published in Ukraine
Weekly magazines
Magazines published in Kyiv
Ukrainian news websites
Free Media Awards winners